Nup End may refer to:
Nup End, Buckinghamshire, England
Nup End, Hertfordshire, England